Terre Haute Action Track (also The Action Track) is a half-mile dirt racetrack located at the Vigo County, Indiana, fairgrounds on U.S. Route 41 along the south side of Terre Haute, Indiana. The track hosts annual United States Automobile Club (USAC) midget car, sprint car and Silver Crown events. Notable drivers that have competed at the track include A. J. Foyt, Jeff Gordon, Parnelli Jones, and Tony Stewart. The track has held events sanctioned by USAC, its predecessor American Automobile Association (AAA), and the World of Outlaws.

History
The track opened on June 15, 1952. It closed for a short period beginning in 1987 and reopened in 1990. It closed again in May 2007 for the rest of the season after it lost its race card because it broke a local curfew. The promoter had to stop the event early. As of the start of the 2008 season, Rich Vogler's 13 feature wins is the most in track history.

Promoters
The track was promoted by Don Smith in the 1960s. By 2008, the track had been run by a series of promoters and attendance dwindled. Most sanctioning bodies holding events at the track dropped it from their schedule and only a few events were held in recent years. The track lost its United States Automobile Club (USAC) events in mid-2007. In 2008, the DHK Promotions LLC group took over running the track. DHK Promotions was named for its founders: then-retired Major League Baseball player Brian Dorsett, then-active (later retired) Indy Racing League driver Davey Hamilton and then-active (later retired) Indianapolis 500 radio announcer Mike King.

In 2009 DHK Promotions added a new partner, changed its name to Action Promotions, LLC and announced a schedule of six special events that took place at the historic half-mile clay oval starting Saturday, May 2. 

Chris Novotney, a Wabash Valley native who grew up attending sprint car races at the famed track, spent 2008 overseeing the reconstruction of the track surface and the installation of a new track drainage system. Novotney joins Brian Dorsett, Davey Hamilton and Mike King in the group that is now known as Action Promotions, LLC.

Since 2012, the track is operated by Terre Haute Motorsports, a partnership between Bob Sargent and Reece O'Connor.

As of 2018, the track is still under the operation of Track Enterprises and company owner Bob Sargent.  Adam Mackey, who is a co-promoter at the facility, announced a more extensive schedule for the 2018 season which features 10 events, significantly more than in recent years.

Media
Track events are no longer broadcast as Crossroads Communications is no longer affiliated with the Track.  In 2009 WTHI Hi-99 became the official track station, though the races were not broadcast.

Hut Hundred
The track held the major midget car racing event since 1954. Event winners include AJ Foyt, Tony Bettenhausen, Don Branson, Tony Stewart, and 1990 winner Jeff Gordon. Rich Vogler won the event eight times, including six in the seven years between 1983 and 1989. Al Herman won the first event in 1954. In 2009 the event was not held and in 2010, it moved to the Tri-State Speedway in Haubstadt, Indiana. The Indiana State Fairgrounds in Indianapolis, Indiana hosted the race in 1987. The 1989 race was held at the Lawrenceburg Speedway. In 1988, 2000 and 2001, the Lincoln Park Speedway in Putnamville, Indiana hosted the race.

 Winners

1954 Al Herman
1955 Tony Bettenhausen
1956 Tony Bettenhausen
1957 Gene Hartley
1958 Don Branson
1959 Gene Hartley
1960 Bob McLean
1961 A. J. Foyt
1962 Ronnie Duman
1963 Bob Wente
1964 Bob Tattersall
1965 A. J. Foyt
1966 Don Branson
1967 Mel Kenyon
1968 Mike McGreevy
1969 Bob Tattersall
1970 Larry Rice
1971 Jerry McClung
1972 Pancho Carter
1973 Bill Englehart
1974 Bobby Olivero
1975 Pancho Carter
1976 Gary Bettenhausen
1977 Bubby Jones
1978 Rich Vogler
1979 Johnny Parsons
1980 Rich Vogler
1981 Warren Mockler
1982 Ron Shuman
1983 Rich Vogler
1984 Rich Vogler
1985 Rich Vogler
1986 Rich Vogler
1987 Johnny Heydenreich
1988 Rich Vogler
1989 Rich Vogler
1990 Jeff Gordon
1991 Stevie Reeves
1992  Steve Knepper
1993 Tony Stewart
1994 Kevin Doty
1995 Tony Stewart
1996 Kevin Olson
1997 Jason Leffler
1998 Donnie Beechler
1999 Dave Darland
2000 Jay Drake
2001 Tracy Hines
2002 Mike Hess
2003 Dave Darland
2004 Bobby East
2005 Johnny Rodriguez
2006 Darren Hagen
2007 No race
2008 Cole Whitt
2009 No race
2010 Bryan Clauson
2011 Zach Daum
2012 Brady Bacon

Results References:

Hulman Classic
One of USAC non-wing sprint car racing's biggest races had its inaugural running at the Terre Haute Action Track in 1971. Named the Hulman Classic in honor of Indianapolis Motor Speedway owner Tony Hulman (who was still alive at the time), the race falls during the week of the Indianapolis 500. In its inaugural year, the race paid a total purse of $28,538 ($ today) and was televised on ABC's Wide World of Sports, becoming the first televised sprint car race in history. In its early years, it was not uncommon for drivers to race both the Hulman Classic and the Indianapolis 500 in the same week. As of May 2017, the Hulman Classic was USAC's longest annually-contested event, and had been held at the Terre Haute Action Track every year except for a brief interruption from 1988 to 1991, when the event was held at Indianapolis Raceway Park.

 Winners

Sumar Classic
The USAC Silver Crown Series first visited Terre Haute in 1980. The series returned in 1995, with the race named Sumar Classic 100, after the local-based 1950s USAC racing team Sumar Racing.

 Winners

 1980 Gary Bettenhausen
 1995 Donnie Beechler
 1996 Kevin Thomas
 1997 Donnie Beechler
 1998 Tony Elliott
 1999 Jack Hewitt
 2002 Tony Elliott
 2003 J. J. Yeley
 2004 Brian Tyler
 2005 Josh Wise
 2006 Bud Kaeding
 2008 Dave Darland
 2010 Levi Jones
 2011 Levi Jones
 2012 Bobby East
 2014 Kody Swanson
 2015 Shane Cockrum
 2016 C.J. Leary
 2017 Chris Windom
 2018 Justin Grant
 2022 Justin Grant

References

External links

Official website

Motorsport venues in Indiana
Buildings and structures in Terre Haute, Indiana
Tourist attractions in Terre Haute, Indiana
Midget car racing